Tessiner Zeitung is a Swiss German-language regional newspaper, published in Locarno, Ticino.

Operations
Tessiner Zeitung was first published in Locarno on 1 September 1908 and was founded by Pietro Giugno. In May 1918 the paper was acquired by a group of journalists who published another newspaper Freie Zeitung.

The paper was published three times per week and had a circulation of 5,000 copies at the beginning of the 1990s. Then the paper began to be published weekly on Fridays. According to WEMF AG, the newspaper had a circulation of 10,002, .

See also
 List of newspapers in Switzerland

References

External links
 tessinerzeitung.ch  the newspaper's official website (in German)

1908 establishments in Switzerland
German-language newspapers published in Switzerland
Mass media in Locarno
Newspapers established in 1908
Weekly newspapers published in Switzerland